Tamaryn Hendler (born 12 August 1992), better known as Tammy Hendler, is a Belgian former tennis player.

Hendler, who resides in Boca Raton, Florida, reached the quarterfinals in the 2008 US Open girls' singles tournament and the semifinals at 2008 junior Wimbledon Championships. She has won four singles titles and five doubles titles on the ITF Women's Circuit, as well as some of the biggest junior tournaments in the world, including Little Mo and Orange Bowl.

She represented Belgium in several Fed Cup ties since 2007 with a win–loss record of 0–8.

Hendler competed in all four Grand Slam qualifying events in 2012. At Roland Garros, she reached the second round of qualifying for the single time in her career.

ITF Circuit finals

Singles: 7 (4 titles, 3 runner-ups)

Doubles: 8 (5–3)

External links

 
 
 
 WorldTeamTennis (WTT) profile

1992 births
Living people
Belgian expatriates in the United States
Belgian female tennis players
Sportspeople from Cape Town
Tennis people from Florida
South African emigrants to Belgium
21st-century Belgian women